Jean Delobel (31 January 1933 – 10 May 2013) was a French politician. He served as a member of the National Assembly from 1997 to 2007, representing Nord.

References

1933 births
2013 deaths
People from Armentières
Deputies of the 12th National Assembly of the French Fifth Republic
Socialist Party (France) politicians